Nitra railway station is situated at Staničná street in the Staré Mesto district of Nitra, Slovakia. Nearby is a busy bus station and a bus stop served by the city's public transport network. Nitra is nowadays out of main railway corridors and the significance of railway transport is only regional.

History 
The history of railways in Nitra dates back to the second half of the nineteenth century. Track section Ivanka pri Nitre (Nyitraivánka) - Nitra (Nyitra) was opened in 1876 and connected Nitra (Nyitra) with tracks Šurany (Nagysurány) - Ivanka pri Nitre (Nyitraivánka) and Palárikovo (Tótmegyer) - Šurany (Nagysurány). Railway to Topoľčany (Nagytapolcsány) was opened in 1881 and local track Nitra - Zbehy (Izbék) - Radošina (Radosna) in 1909.

Main building was built around 1876, and extended with dispatchers' offices in 1921. Today's look of the building originates in 1925, after the electrification of station lights was finished.

Reconstruction 
The railway station is scheduled to undertake complete reconstruction in 2014–2015. The approximate budget for the reconstruction is  €4 150 000  without value added tax. Because of Financial crisis of 2007–2010 and lack of funds at ŽSR (Železnice Slovenskej Republiky) the future of this project remains unclear.

Services

References 

Nitra
Buildings and structures in Nitra
Nitra
Railway stations in Slovakia opened in the 19th century